Tanisha, meaning ambition in Sanskrit, is a feminine given name. Tanisha \t(a)-ni-sha\ is pronounced Tanīṣā. Tanisha is the feminine equivalent of the name Tanish and is primarily a first name. Persons with the name Tanisha are commonly Hindu by religion or of the Indo-Aryan peoples.

Tanisha is a Hausa variant transcription of the name Tani (Hausa and English) and means born on a Monday in Hausa.

Tanisha is also a variant transcription of the name Tansy (English). It can also be a combination of Ta- with Aisha.

Tanisha meaning child saint is spelled `Tana Shah' in Urdu or as Tani Shah, meaning "benevolent ruler".

Popularity 

The name Tanisha appears in Swahili, English, Arabic, Japanese & Urdu.

Japan
The name Tanisha when pronounced tah-nEE-shah; in Japanese is タニーシャ with the romaji tani-sha.
Tanisha as a non-Japanese name is properly rendered in Japanese using katakana タニシャ. Tanisha rendered in hiragana generally is considered to be more feminine. Tanisha in hiragana is たにいしゃ and has the romaji taniisha. Notice that the hiragana rendering differs from the katakana due to the fact that katakana has fairly recently evolved to better render non-Japanese sounds into Japanese. The katakana and hiragana only render the syllable sounds and has no meaning in Japanese.

United States
In the United States, it is a predominantly African-American name first popularized in the 1960s by the actress Ta-Tanisha, who appeared on the television program Room 222. Ta-Tanisha loosely translated in Swahili means "Puzzling One".

The American English pronunciation of Tanisha \t(a)-ni-sha\ is ta-NEE-shah or tuh-NEE-shuh. By the 1970s and 1980s, it had become common within the African American culture to invent new names, although many of the invented names took elements from popular existing names. Prefixes such as La/Le, Da/De, Ra/Re, or Ja/Je are common, as well as inventive spellings for the name Tanisha.

US Popularity by Rank top 1000 names

Note: Rank 1 is the most popular, rank 2 is the next most popular, and so forth. Data are not shown for some of the years specified because the name Tanisha was not in the top 1000 names for those years. Name data are from Social Security card applications for births that occurred in the United States.

Records indicate that 17,012 girls in the United States have been named Tanisha since 1880. The greatest number of infants were given this name in 1982; that year, 756 infants in the U.S. were named Tanisha. This cohort is now  years old, part of the early Millennial generation.

Prejudice
In the United States, the name Tanisha is primarily known as an African-American name. The name Tanisha has been used as an example of a stereotypical African-American name that elicits racial bias, in articles addressing institutional racism that Black Americans face when seeking employment, housing, bank loans and credit cards.

The National Bureau of Economic Research in Massachusetts released the results of a field experiment on Labour discrimination titled "ARE EMILY AND GREG MORE EMPLOYABLE THAN LAKISHA AND JAMAL?" by Marianne Bertrand and Sendhil Mullainathan. During the field experiment, job applicants in Massachusetts with the name Tanisha was called back 6.3%; resumes with a more White-sounding name have a 10.08% call back rate.

Spellings 
Common spellings for Tanisha:

Nicknames
Common nicknames for Tanisha/Tanesha:

People

Given name

Media 

Tanishaa Mukerji (born 1978), Bollywood actress
Tanisha Thomas (born 1985), Reality TV Star, Host
Tanisha Mariko Harper (born 1981), model, actress and television host
Tanisha Tamara Drummond Johnson (born c. 1976), Panamanian model and beauty pageant contestant winner of the Señorita Panamá 1997
Tanisha Lynn Eanes (born 1978 in Houston, Texas), American actress
Tanisha Scott (born in Toronto, Canada), three-time MTV VMA-nominated choreographer
Tanisha Nicole Brito (born 1980), beauty queen who has competed at both Miss America and Miss USA
Tanisha Malone, Winner of the 2006 edition of Mo'Nique's Fat Chance a reality TV miniseries
Tanisha Yarndriciaes Delores Neal, uses the pseudonym Toni Neal (born 1976), broadcaster
Tanisha Belnap, contestant on So You Think You Can Dance (U.S. season 11) an American dance competition show
Tanisha contestant on Big Brother (Switzerland) a reality game show franchise
Tanisha Dutta uses the pseudonym Tina Datta, Indian actress
Tanisha Vernon (born 1987), beauty queen and winner of Miss Belize Universe 2007 pageant

Music 
Tanisha Michele Morgan, member of the female rap duo group BWP (Bytches With Problems)

Other 
Tanishia Covington (born 1992), convicted felon "2017 Chicago torture incident"

Pseudonym
 Ta-Tanisha (born Shirley Cummings, in 1953) American character actress

Sports 
Tanisha Lovely Wright (born 1983), American women’s basketball player

Title
Tanisha is a popularly declared title usually bestowed by the people.
Abul Hasan Qutb Shah nicknamed as 'Tana Shah' meaning child saint also known as Abul Hasan Tana Shah or Tani Shah meaning "benevolent ruler". The Tannashah, Tánėshá or Tánísha (a title) was a Nabob of Golconda.

Fictional characters

Filmography
Tanisha, the emperor of Golconda - role played by Nassar in the 2006 Telugu Devotional Movie Sri Ramadasu directed by K. Raghavendra Rao.
Tanisha, role played by Tanusree Chakraborty in the 2012 Bengali drama film Bedroom directed by Mainak Bhaumik.
Private Tanisha Robinson, role played by Michelle Buteau - Enlisted (TV series).
Tanisha, role played by Preeti Puri - Mamta (TV series).

Literature
Tanisha - A Shikaza woman also known as Kahutu, first appearance in the first edition Imaro (novel), written by Charles R. Saunders.
Tanisha -  (initial Key holder, resigned) The Council Wars, an in-progress book series by John Ringo.

See also

 Nisha (disambiguation)
 Tanish (name)
 Tanisha (disambiguation)
 Tanya (name)

References

Category:Indian given names
Category:Hindu given names

Feminine given names
Indian feminine given names
African-American given names
African-American feminine given names
Arabic feminine given names
Titles
African feminine given names
Given names